Michael Sternkopf (born 21 April 1970 in Karlsruhe) is a German former professional footballer who played for Karlsruher SC, Bayern Munich, Borussia Mönchengladbach, SC Freiburg, Arminia Bielefeld and Kickers Offenbach, as well as for the Germany under-21 national team.

Honours
Bayern Munich
 DFL-Supercup: 1990
 Bundesliga: 1993–94

References

External links
 

1970 births
Living people
Footballers from Karlsruhe
German footballers
Association football wingers
Germany under-21 international footballers
Bundesliga players
2. Bundesliga players
Karlsruher SC players
Karlsruher SC II players
FC Bayern Munich footballers
Borussia Mönchengladbach players
SC Freiburg players
Arminia Bielefeld players
Kickers Offenbach players